Broken Ways is a 1913 American short silent Western film directed by D. W. Griffith, starring Henry B. Walthall and Blanche Sweet. A print of the film survives.

Cast
 Henry B. Walthall as The Road Agent
 Blanche Sweet as The Road Agent's Wife
 Harry Carey as The Sheriff
 Charles Gorman as Hold Up Victim
 Frank Opperman as Road Agent's Gang Member
 Joseph McDermott as Road Agent's Gang Member
 Gertrude Bambrick in Telegraph Office and on Street
 William A. Carroll in Posse
 Edward Dillon
 Dorothy Gish in Telegraph Office
 Robert Harron in Telegraph Office
 Adolph Lestina in Telegraph Office
 Mae Marsh
 Walter Miller in Town
 Alfred Paget in Posse

See also
 List of American films of 1913
 Harry Carey filmography
 D. W. Griffith filmography
 Blanche Sweet filmography

References

External links
 

1913 films
1913 Western (genre) films
1913 short films
American silent short films
American black-and-white films
Biograph Company films
Films directed by D. W. Griffith
Silent American Western (genre) films
1910s American films